This is a list of Slovenian writers. Names are in English alphabetical order. Information not on a person's page needs a reference.

See also
Slovenian literature
List of Slovenian women writers
List of Slovenian language poets
List of Slovenian writers and poets in Hungary

Slovenian writers
Writers